"Jealous" is a song recorded by Irish singer Sinéad O'Connor for her fifth studio album Faith and Courage (2000). It was released as the album's second single on 31 October 2000, by Atlantic Records.

Background
In 1998, Sinéad O'Connor left label Ensign Records and signed with Atlantic Records, but her album was delayed by due to her personal struggles, including the birth of her daughter, an alleged suicide attempt, a bitter custody battle and becoming a priestess in a religious order. O'Connor described Faith and Courage, her first album with Atlantic, as a record about "survival" which depicted her own troubled "journey" as she bared her soul on a series of autobiographical and often cathartic songs. "It's exciting and a little scary to be back. I wanted to make a record which was strong and positive. It's about getting my spirit back on its feet and standing up", she said.

Composition
Wall of Sound commented that the song "ruminate on loves lost, found, and, in most cases, fondly remembered".

Critical reception
Davíð Logi Sigurðsson, while reviewing Faith and Courage for Icelandic newspaper Morgunblaðið, thought that "Jealous" was probably the best song on the album. AllMusic's MacKenzie Wilson noted that she sounded "lonely" on the song.

Music video
The music video was directed by Mike Lipscombe and was released in 2000.

Track listing
European CD single
"Jealous" (Album Version) – 4:19
"Summer's End" – 5:40
"Full Circle" – 3:44

Personnel

Sinéad O'Connor – vocals, songwriter, producer
David A. Stewart – songwriter, producer, guitar
Jah Wobble – bass
John Reynolds – drums
Nick Addison – engineer
Graham Dominy – engineer assistant

Kieran Kiely – keyboards
Ed Rockett – low whistle
Caroline Dale – strings
Andy Wright – programming
Mark Price – programming
Ash Howes – mixing
Emily Lazar – mastering

Charts

References

2000 songs
Music videos directed by Mike Lipscombe
Sinéad O'Connor songs
Songs written by Sinéad O'Connor
Songs written by David A. Stewart